A hydrodynamic seal is a type of mechanical seal. A hydrodynamic seals uses a dynamic rotor with grooves that act as a pump and create an air film that the opposing sealing surface will ride on. A hydrodynamic seal performs better than hydrostatic seals by providing greater film stiffness, lower leakage and lower lift off speeds. Hydrodynamic seals have a variety of applications in multiple industries. there are a large number of various groove designs that have been proposed and tested.

Types of Hydrodynamic Grooves
 Spiral Groove
 Wave
 V Grooves
 U Grooves
 Double V Grooves

Seals (mechanical)